Adrien Gouteyron (13 May 1933 – 26 August 2020) was a French politician and a member of the Senate of France. He represented the Haute-Loire department and was a member of the Union for a Popular Movement Party.

References

1933 births
French Senators of the Fifth Republic
Union for a Popular Movement politicians
Debout la France politicians
Vice-presidents of the Senate (France)
Senators of Haute-Loire
2020 deaths